José Gregorio Liendo Vera (1945 – October 3, 1973), also known as "Compañero Pepe", "Comandante Pepe" or "Loco Pepe" was a Chilean university student, political leader and militant of the Revolutionary Left Movement ("Movimiento de Izquierda Revolucionaria"; "MIR"), a Marxist-Leninist and Guevarist urban guerrilla and political movement. He was also a leader and member of the "Movimiento Campesino Revolucionario" (MCR), the MIR's Front of the Masses ("Frente de Masas") among the Chilean peasantry, which participated in the fundos occupations during the government democratically elected socialist President Salvador Allende, and served with the leftist political coalition Unidad Popular in the early 1970s.

He and other militants of the MCR-MIR planned and carried out the attack on the police station of Neltume on September 12, 1973, the day after the 1973 Chilean coup d'etat. He had originally moved into the zone of Neltume in the 1960s after quitting his Agronomy university studies. Liendo was executed in the prison of Isla Teja by a firing squad on October 3, 1973, after a "war council" accused him of having led the guerrilla warfare assault the police Neltume's station and the robbery, assault, rape and killing of Antonieta Maachel in November 1970

References

Sources 
 José Gregorio LIENDO VERA, Memoria Viva. Retrieved 27 September 2009.
 Guzmán reconstituye asalto a retén Neltume, El Mercurio. Published April 13, 2003. retrieved 27 September 2009.
 Violencia y muerte en el campo chileno, Economía y Sociedad nº97. Retrieved October 2018.
 https://ellibero.cl/carta/no-mas-terrorismo/
 https://viva-chile.cl/2017/11/la-justicia-sigue-pendiente/
 Senado de Chile (26 July 1972). «Diario de sesión: Sesión Especial № 42 del Senado, Legislatura 1972 - V.-Orden del día. Acusación constitucional contra el ministro de Interior, señor Hernándel Canto Riquelme». www.bcn.cl. Consultado el 10 September 2019. «La lista en referencia, la encabeza el obrero Juan Félix Leiva Riquelme. A continuación figura doña Antonieta Maachel, que se suicidó en su predio, en la ciudad de Valdivia, el 29 November 1970, en circunstancias de que había sido secuestrada por ocupantes miristas de dicho predio [...]».

Executed revolutionaries
1945 births
1973 deaths
Executed Chilean people
People executed by Chile by firing squad
20th-century executions by Chile